Sidney Cross (5 January 1891 – 7 October 1964) was a British gymnast who competed in the 1912 Summer Olympics and in the 1920 Summer Olympics.

He was part of the British team, which won the bronze medal in the gymnastics men's team, European system event in 1912. As a member of the British team in 1920 he finished fifth in the team, European system competition.

References

External links
Sidney Cross' profile at databaseOlympics
Sidney Cross' profile at Sports Reference.com

1891 births
1964 deaths
British male artistic gymnasts
Gymnasts at the 1912 Summer Olympics
Gymnasts at the 1920 Summer Olympics
Olympic gymnasts of Great Britain
Olympic bronze medallists for Great Britain
Olympic medalists in gymnastics
Medalists at the 1912 Summer Olympics